Adriana Cecilia Mitroi (born Adriana Cecilia Teocan 16 June 1994) is a Romanian rhythmic gymnast.

She competed at the 2010 World Rhythmic Gymnastics Championships, and 2013 Rhythmic Gymnastics World Cup.

References

External links 

 Adriana Cecilia Teocan - ROU - Fita (Ribbon) - Qualification - WC of Lisbon 2013
 Adriana Cecilia Teocan, ROM, at the Rhythmic Gymnastics World Championships 21/09/2010, Schreyer.

Living people
1994 births
Romanian rhythmic gymnasts
Gymnasts from Bucharest